This is a timeline documenting the events of heavy metal in the year 1971.

Newly formed bands 
Aquelarre 
Buffalo 
Camel
 Captain Beyond
Color Humano
Foghat
 The Flying Hat Band
GoodThunder
 Hard Stuff
Jo Jo Gunne
Manfred Mann's Earth Band
Molly Hatchet
 New York Dolls
 Pentagram
Pescado Rabioso
White Witch

Albums

January

March

April

June

July

August

September

October

November

Unknown 
 Sir Lord Baltimore - Sir Lord Baltimore
 UFO - Flying

Disbandments 
 Blue Cheer (temporarily)
 Iron Butterfly (reformed in 1974)
 Sir Lord Baltimore (reformed in 2006)

Births
March 29 - Attila Csihar, Hungarian vocalist

References 

1970s in heavy metal music
Metal